Isabel Marion Seymour (born 1882) was a UK suffragette who was employed by the Women's Social and Political Union. She undertook speaking tours in Europe. She later became a Councillor.

Life
Seymour was born in 1882 in Middlesex. Her parents were Charles and Marion Seymour  and she became a fluent speaker in both English and German. She was introduced to the Women's Social and Political Union by her friends Frederick and Emmeline Pethick Lawrence. She was employed by the WSPU and was involved in administering the accommodation and bail that was required by WSPU members, as hospitality secretary, a role she then handed over to Irene Dallas. She was a confident speaker in English and German and she went on a speaking tour in Germany and Russia on behalf of the WSPU. In 1909, she was honoured with an invitation to Eagle House in Somerset. This was the home of Colonel Linley and Emily Blathwayt. They supported their daughter Mary Blathwayt and the other WSPU members by providing accommodation for recovering suffragette's. In addition Emily had constructed an arboretum of trees where each new tree was planted by a suffragette. The Blathwayts would also create a plaque and photographs would be taken to record the planting. Seymour planted a holly bush on 24 October 1909.

She later moved to Canada for eight years but she returned to the UK where she became a county councillor for Hampshire.

References

1882 births
Secretaries
19th-century English women
19th-century English people
20th-century English women
20th-century English people
Eagle House suffragettes
People from Hampshire (before 1974)
Councillors in Hampshire
Women councillors in England
20th-century British women politicians
English expatriates in Canada
Year of death missing